Lithogenes is a genus of South American catfish of the family Loricariidae. It is the only genus within the subfamily Lithogeneinae.

Taxonomy
Lithogenes is the only genus within the subfamily Lithogeneinae. This genus and subfamily, the most basal group in Loricariidae, is the sister group to the rest of the family. Relative to an undescribed species of Lithogeneinae, L. valencia has sister group relationship to L. villosus.

Species
The three recognized species in this genus are:
 Lithogenes valencia Provenzano, Schaefer, Baskin & Royero-Leon, 2003
 Lithogenes villosus Eigenmann, 1909
 Lithogenes wahari Schaefer & Provenzano, 2008

Appearance and anatomy
As members of the family Loricariidae, all Lithogenes species have a suckermouth. However, unlike most loricariids, species of the genus Lithogenes possess armor plating only on the latter half of the body. Their eyes are small and their bodies flattened.

Distribution and habitat
L. villosus originates from the Essequibo River drainage of the Guiana Shield. An undescribed species of Lithogenes is known from the Orinoco basin of the Guiana Shield. L. valencia has only been known from six specimens collected in the 1970s from tributaries of the Lake Valencia in northern Venezuela; however, this area has since been polluted and this species possibly is now extinct.

L. villosus lives in habitats dominated by rapids over bedrock, and L. valencia likely does, as well.

References

Loricariidae
Fish of South America
Catfish genera
Taxa named by Carl H. Eigenmann
Freshwater fish genera